The 2007 World Women's Handball Championship was the 18th edition of the international championship tournament in women's team sport handball that is governed by the International Handball Federation (IHF). France hosted the event from 2–16 December 2007. A total of 24 teams participated in the tournament. Russia successfully contested Norway in the final, regaining the title after having lost it at the 2005 final.

Venues 

Source: IHF.info

Qualification

Preliminary round 
The draw for the preliminary round took place in Paris on 20 June 2007.

Group A

Group B

Group C

Group D

Group E

Group F

President's Cup

Group I

Group II

Group III

Group IV

23rd place game

21st place game

19th place game

17th place game

15th place game

13th place game

Main round

Group M I

Group M II

Knockout stage

Bracket
Championship bracket

5th place bracket

Quarterfinals

5–8th place semifinals

Semifinals

Eleventh place game

Ninth place game

Seventh place game

Fifth place game

Third place game

Final

Ranking and statistics

Final ranking

All-star team
Goalkeeper: 
Left wing: 
Left back: 
Pivot: 
Centre back: 
Right back: 
Right wing: 
Chosen by team officials and IHF experts: IHF.info

Top Goalkeepers

Top goalscorers

Medalists

Notes

External links 
 Official website
 International Handball Federation WHC-page

2007 in French women's sport
2007
World Championship, Women, 2007
World Championship, 2007
World Championship
World Women's Handball Championship